The Taipei Language Institute (TLI) was founded in 1956 by a group of missionaries who wished to provide training in Mandarin Chinese for Taiwan-bound missionaries.  Originally named Missionary Language Institute, the founder Dr. Marvin Ho created the institute as a means of educating these foreigners in Mandarin and Taiwanese.

History
As the demand for language instruction of foreigners increased, the institute soon found that it could no longer limit itself to training missionaries. In 1958, the school expanded its enterprise and took the name of Taipei Language Institute.  It opened its doors to any foreigners aspiring to study Chinese and Chinese heritage in Taiwan.

From the humble beginnings of the first TLI Institute which started with 30 students in Taipei, TLI has grown exponentially over the years to 16 centers across the globe - in Taiwan, China, Japan, the United States, and Canada.  TLI has trained tens of thousands of students worldwide, and has instructed clients from a wide range of professions: diplomatic personnel, international businesspeople, engineers, journalists, missionaries, professors, authors, college students, and overseas Chinese.  TLI has prepared hundreds of variations of textbooks and materials covering dozens of different subject matter ranging in difficult level. Courses at TLI are mostly small-group classes of 2-6 students or private tutorials and rigorous audiolingual methods are employed.  TLI has compiled many of its own materials, but beginning with the high-intermediate level, students are given the freedom to design their own curriculum based on current or anticipated job needs.  It is also possible to study mainland Chinese material which uses simplified characters.  The Taipei Language Institute also works in close partnership with the American Institute in Taiwan at their Chinese language school in Yangmingshan to provide full-time, advanced training in speaking and reading Mandarin Chinese for diplomatic personnel and employees who need to attain professional proficiency.

Timeline
1959: TLI signed a contract with the U.S. Department of State to train American diplomats in Taiwan, including the personnel of the American Embassy, Military Assistance Advisory Group and Mutual Defense Headquarters.  This relationship lasted 20 years, only ending when diplomatic relations between the Republic of China and the U.S. broke off in 1979.

1967: Dr. Marvin Ho, president of TLI, established the Department of Chinese Studies at the University of Delhi in India and designed its curriculum.  A large number of Indian students enrolled and later became Chinese translators and interpreters in all levels of Indian Government.

1971: By invitation of the Hong Kong Christian Association, TLI established a Chinese Language Institute in Kowloon, which consisted of the Mandarin Language Department and Cantonese Language Department, for the training of foreign religious groups, businesspeople, diplomats, and locals.

1996: TLI expanded into mainland China and Japan.

2000: TLI established an American campus in San Jose, California

2009: TLI and Beijing Language and Culture University (BLCU) signed an agreement on 28 April that grants TLI the exclusive right to conduct Hanyu Shuiping Kaoshi examinations in the Taiwan area.

Notable alumni
J. Stapleton Roy -  American diplomat specializing in Asian affairs
John K. Fairbank -  American academic and founder of the Center for Asian Research at Harvard University.
Charles W. Freeman, Jr. - American Diplomat and Chair in China Studies at Center for Strategic and International Studies
Ma Ying-Jeou - President of the Republic of China (Taiwanese Language Study)
Nicholas D. Kristof - American journalist, author, op-ed columnist, and a winner of two Pulitzer Prizes
Eunice S. Reddick - American diplomat
C. Martin Wilbur - Professor of Chinese History at Columbia University
Christopher Doyle - Award-winning Cinematographer
Afaa M. Weaver - American Poet

See also
List of Chinese language schools in Taiwan

References

External links
 Official website 

1956 establishments in Taiwan
Academic language institutions
Language schools in Taiwan
Organizations based in Taipei
Educational institutions established in 1956
Schools of Chinese as a second or foreign language